Duside Hospital is a hospital in Firestone District, Margibi County, Liberia. It holds 300 beds and is operated by the Firestone Tire and Rubber Company. It reopened in December 2008 and in January 2010, was considered one of the best hospitals in Liberia.

See also 
 List of hospitals in Liberia

References

Hospital buildings completed in 1957
Hospitals in Liberia
Margibi County
1950s establishments in Liberia